William Marmion (1845–1896) was an Australian politician.

William Marmion may also refer to:

William Marmion, Baron Marmion of Torrington (died 1265), English clergyman and member of Simon de Montfort's Parliament
William Marmion (died 1274) (died 1274), son of Robert Marmion (died 1242)
William Marmion (Norham Castle Knight), possibly the Leicestershire MP, see John Marmion, 4th Baron Marmion of Winteringham
Sir William Marmion (Leics MP 1307), member of parliament for Leicestershire
Sir William Marmion (Lincs MP 1357), member of parliament for Lincolnshire
William Marmion (died 1529) (1461–1529), member of parliament for Gloucester
William H. Marmion (1907–2002), bishop of the Episcopal Diocese of Southwestern Virginia
Bill Marmion (born 1954), Australian member of the Legislative Assembly of Western Australia